Heterodera trifolii is a plant pathogenic nematode.

Infected plants 
See :
 List of alfalfa diseases
 List of beet diseases
 List of spinach diseases
 List of red clover diseases
 List of carnation diseases

References 

trifolii
Plant pathogenic nematodes
Food plant pathogens and diseases
Ornamental plant pathogens and diseases